Teresa Lipowska (born 14 July 1937 in Warsaw) is a Polish actress. She is best known as Barbara Mostowiak in the very popular Polish soap opera M jak miłość. Lipowska was married to late actor Tomasz Zaliwski.

Biography 
She is the eldest daughter of officials, Maria née Niegowska and Eugeniusz Wittczak. She spent the first years of her life in Warsaw, and after the war she moved to Lodz with her family. She grew up with two younger siblings, sister Elżbieta (1941–1990) and brother Andrzej (born 1945).

As a child, she started learning to play the piano, she also played in school performances and recited poems, and at the age of nine she made her theater debut, playing a frog princess in the play Behind the Seven Mountains staged at the Lutnia Theater in Łódź. At the age of 13, she made her screen debut as an extra in Leonard Buczkowski's First Start.

Credits
 2003: Emil Karewicz. Portret aktora
 2000–2001: Miasteczko – Grandma Ola's Friend
 2000–today: M jak miłość – Barbara Mostowiak
 1998: Matki, żony i kochanki II – Stefania Pawelec
 1998: Gosia i Małgosia – Mother Gosia
 1998: Pułkownik Bunkier (Colonel Bunker) – mother
 1998–2003: Miodowe lata – Mr Halska (2003)
 1997–2006: Klan – mgr Helena Frączak
 1997–1998: 13. posterunek – Mr Lucynka
 1997: Sara – saleslady
 1997: Przystań – mother
 1995: Matki, żony i kochanki – Stefania Pawelec
 1995: Tato – Michał's mother-in-law
 1993: Kraj świata – women
 1993–1994: Zespół adwokacki – Maria Malak, Henryk's mother (1993)
 1993: Czterdziestolatek. 20 lat później – Kiki's mother
 1991–1993: Kuchnia polska
 1989: Czarny wąwóz – Ludwika
 1988–1991: W labiryncie – nurse
 1988: Przeprawa
 1988: Zakole
 1987: Ballada o Januszku
 1986: A żyć trzeba dalej
 1985: Dłużnicy śmierci
 1984: Alabama – Bożena's mother
 1984: Pan na Żuławach
 1983: Podróż nad morze
 1983: Marynia – Bigielowa
 1983: Katastrofa w Gibraltarze – Helena Sikorska
 1983: Pastorale Heroica – Chudzina
 1982–1986: Blisko, coraz bliżej – Teresa
 1981: Kto ty jesteś – Halina
 1981: Uczennica – Jadwiga Hinelowa, Anna's mother
 1980–2000: Dom
 1980: Dziewczyna i chłopak
 1980: Tylko Kaśka – teacher Piotrowska
 1979: Placówka – Jagna
 1979: Klucznik – klucznik's wife
 1978: W biegu
 1978: Pogrzeb świerszcza – Broniewiczowa
 1978: Ty pójdziesz górą - Eliza Orzeszkowa – Konopnicka Maria
 1978: Wśród nocnej ciszy – Helena, Wańko's wife
 1978: Rodzina Połanieckich
 1978: Ślad na ziemi
 1977: Dziewczyna i chłopak
 1977: Lalka – Szperlingowa
 1977: Noce i dnie – Stacha Łuczakówna
 1976: Zezem
 1976: Polskie drogi
 1975: Obrazki z życia – Bożena's mother
 1975: Noce i dnie – Stacha Łuczakówna
 1975: Hazardziści – Budziak's wife
 1975: Dyrektorzy – Szymanek's sister
 1974: Linia – Elżbieta
 1973: Stawiam na Tolka Banana
 1973: Znak – Wife
 1973: Profesor na drodze – Helena Grzegorkowa
 1973: Bułeczka – Karol's mother
 1972: Ogłoszenie matrymonialne
 1971: Przystań – Żeberkiewiczowa
 1971: Złote koło - Elżbieta Zalewska
 1970: Przygody psa Cywila – teacher
 1969: Rzeczpospolita babska – Danuta Pawlak
 1968: Wniebowstąpienie
 1968: Hasło Korn – Krystyna Kacperska
 1966: Sublokator – Fredzia Kwaśniewska
 1965: Wizyta u królów
 1965: Sam pośród miasta – Paweł's wife
 1965: Piwo
 1964: Barbara i Jan
 1962: Spóźnieni przechodnie –
 1956: Szkice węglem –
 1956: Nikodem Dyzma – women
 1950: Pierwszy start – Junaczka

Prizes
Polish television awards “Teleekrany 2004” in the category Best Actress.

References

External links

1937 births
Living people
Polish film actresses
Recipients of the Silver Medal for Merit to Culture – Gloria Artis
Recipients of the Gold Cross of Merit (Poland)
Knights of the Order of Polonia Restituta
Polish soap opera actresses
Actresses from Warsaw
20th-century Polish actresses
21st-century Polish actresses